Akatsuki (PLH-34) is a  currently operated by the Japanese Coast Guard.

Design

Construction and career 
Akatsuki was laid down on 16 February 2018 and launched on 10 April 2020 by Mitsubishi, Nagasaki. She was commissioned on 16 February 2021.

References

Bibliography
 
 
 

Shikishima-class patrol vessels
2020 ships
Ships built by Mitsubishi Heavy Industries